Joel Jacobs (born March 31, 1932) is an American politician in the state of Minnesota. He served in the Minnesota House of Representatives from 1973–1982 and 1983–1995.

References

1932 births
Living people
People from Coon Rapids, Minnesota
People from Pelican Rapids, Minnesota
Minnesota State University Moorhead alumni
St. Cloud State University alumni
Educators from Minnesota
Democratic Party members of the Minnesota House of Representatives